Run Sweetheart Run is a 2020 American supernatural horror film directed by Shana Feste from a screenplay by Feste, Keith Josef Adkins and Kellee Terrell. The film stars Ella Balinska, Pilou Asbæk, Dayo Okeniyi, Betsy Brandt, Ava Grey, Lamar Johnson, Jess Gabor, Clark Gregg, and Shohreh Aghdashloo.

Run Sweetheart Run had its world premiere at the 2020 Sundance Film Festival, and was released on October 28, 2022, by Amazon Studios.

Plot

Cherie is a young single mother and pre-law student working as a secretary for a legal firm in Los Angeles. On her way home, Cherie receives a frantic call from her boss James, who says that Cherie double-booked him for dinner with an important client at the same time as his anniversary dinner, which Cherie has no memory of. James asks Cherie to go to the dinner for him and she reluctantly accepts. While preparing for the dinner, Cherie's period starts and she realizes that she is out of tampons.

Cherie meets the client, Ethan, at his house and the two go to dinner. Cherie is taken with the handsome and charming Ethan, although he has a sudden outburst of anger when approached by a dog, explaining that he was bitten by one as a child. Ethan invites Cherie to spend the night with him, setting an alarm on his phone for the early morning so that she can return home before her daughter wakes up. When he does, Cherie notices that he already has an alarm for 5:25 AM. She agrees to stay for a drink; however, when they enter his house, Ethan attacks Cherie, causing her to flee.

Running down the street, Cherie tries to get help from nearby residents but is ignored. She finally finds two women outside a movie theater and convinces them to call 911. The police arrive and arrest Cherie for public intoxication, despite her protestations that she was attacked. Cherie talks to another woman in the cell who panics when Cherie describes Ethan. The woman warns Cherie that Ethan "controls men" and that her only hope is to find the "First Lady". The police escort Ethan into Cherie's cell, where he tells her that he will hunt her, and that if she survives until morning, he will let her go.

Upon being released, Cherie heads to James' apartment. He seems sympathetic, offering her clean clothes to wear. Cherie looks for information about Ethan on James' computer and finds that she is the latest in a long string of women marked as tithes for Ethan. James' wife, Judy, fearfully warns Cherie that Ethan can smell her blood and that she should clean herself thoroughly. Cherie flees on a bus and then calls her ex-boyfriend Trey for help.

Desperate for tampons, Cherie stops at a gas station and buys some. Ethan finds her and attacks her. The store clerk tries to defend Cherie, but Ethan orders him away. Cherie strikes Ethan in the head and escapes with the help of Trey, who has arrived on scene. Cherie eventually tells Trey that she was attacked; he agrees to take her to his place despite the fact that his new girlfriend, Dawn, Cherie's former best friend who now hates her, is there. When Dawn sees Cherie, she is unexpectedly sympathetic, realizing that Cherie has been attacked. As Cherie cleans up, Ethan arrives looking for her. Dawn and her friends arm themselves to fight him off, but he easily kills them. Ethan forces Cherie to leave with him. Trey, who had gone out, returns home and confronts Ethan, who decapitates him.

Cherie flees, and remembering Judy's advice, throws some of her menstrual blood onto a passing car to distract Ethan. Cherie flees to a church where she asks the priest for holy water and a crucifix, hoping to ward off Ethan. She discovers the body of the priest and realizes that Ethan had assumed his form. Ethan then reveals his true form to Cherie. Returning to human form, Ethan is attacked by the priest, allowing Cherie to escape.

Cherie finds her way into an underground rave where she uses bleach wipes to clean up her blood. She sees a flyer for the First Lady and calls the number on it, getting the location for a nearby spa. When Cherie is accosted by a man, she is rescued by a group of party girls who take her with them. As they leave the rave, the girls offer to take Cherie surfing in the early morning, but Cherie realizes that Ethan's alarm was set for sunrise. Just then, Ethan attacks them until Cherie is saved when a pitbull shows up, barking at Ethan and causing him to disappear.

Cherie makes her way to the spa, where she discovers the "First Lady", Dinah, and a group of women who are practicing martial arts. Dinah explains that Ethan is a fallen angel whose job was to protect and guide humanity. Ethan had decided that men should rule and used his prodigious powers to assure masculine ascendance throughout history. Dinah says that she needs to use Cherie as bait to lure Ethan out so that he can be defeated.

The women clean Cherie up and she drives to the Santa Monica Pier. There, Cherie reopens her wounds, attracting Ethan. Ethan toys with her, but just as he is about to kill Cherie, his alarm rings and he realizes that the dawn has arrived. Cherie throws a rock through a blacked-out window, exposing Ethan to the sunlight and incapacitating him. The women from the spa, who have gathered outside, throw more rocks through the windows, flooding the room with sunlight and mortally weakening Ethan.

Outside, Cherie mocks the now-weakened Ethan as his power dies. Dinah lights Ethan on fire, killing him. Cherie finally returns home to her daughter.

Cast

Production
In June 2018, it was announced Shana Feste would direct the film, from a screenplay she wrote alongside Keith Josef Adkins and Kellee Terrell. Jason Blum, Brian Kavanaugh-Jones, and Feste will serve as producers on the film, under their Blumhouse Productions, Automatik and Quiet Girl Productions banners, respectively. In February 2019, Ella Balinska, Pilou Asbaek, Clark Gregg, Dayo Okeniyi, Betsy Brandt and Shohreh Aghdashloo joined the cast of the film. Feste based the film on her real-life experiences of being a victim of a traumatizing date and sexual assault.

Principal photography began in Los Angeles in February 2019.

Release
It had its world premiere at the Sundance Film Festival on January 27, 2020. It was also scheduled to screen at South by Southwest on March 13, 2020, but the festival was cancelled due to the COVID-19 pandemic. It was scheduled to be released theatrically by Blumhouse Tilt and OTL Releasing on May 8, 2020, but it was pulled from the schedule due to movie theater closures because of the pandemic restrictions. In May 2020, Amazon Studios acquired distribution rights to the film, and released it digitally on Amazon Prime Video on October 28, 2022.

Critical response
 Metacritic, which uses a weighted average, gave the film a score of 51 out of 100 based on 14 critic reviews, indicating "mixed or average reviews".

References

External links
 
 

2020 films
2020 horror thriller films
2020 independent films
2020s American films
2020s chase films
2020s English-language films
2020s feminist films
2020s supernatural horror films
2020s supernatural thriller films
Amazon Prime Video original films
Amazon Studios films
American chase films
American feminist films
American horror thriller films
American supernatural horror films
American supernatural thriller films
Blumhouse Productions films
Films directed by Shana Feste
Films not released in theaters due to the COVID-19 pandemic
Films produced by Jason Blum
Films scored by Robin Coudert
Films set in Los Angeles
Films set in Santa Monica, California
Films shot in Los Angeles